Shagufta Ali is an Indian film and television actress. She is known for her roles in Punar Vivah, Ek Veer Ki Ardaas...Veera, Sasural Simar Ka and Saath Nibhaana Saathiya. In 2018, she was seen in Colors TV's Bepannaah. She has danced in an item song in Tamil movie uzhaippali with super star Rajnikanth

Filmography

Television 
 1989: Dard
 1990: Agar Aisa Ho To
 1993-1998: Kanoon
 1993-1998: Parampara as Barkha
1993 : Junoon
 1995: Zee Horror Show
 1998-99Saans
 2001-05 Dishayen
 2002-05 Sanjivani: A Medical Boon
 2004: Isse Kehte Hai Golmaal Ghar
 2005 - 2010: Woh Rehne Waali Mehlon Ki
 2006-08 Zaara
 2010 Sasural Genda Phool 
 2011 Sasural Simar Ka Sugandha/Arti
 2012 - 2013: Punar Vivah
 2012 Madhubala – Ek Ishq Ek Junoon
 2013 - 2015: Ek Veer Ki Ardaas...Veera
 2013: Adaalat
 2016 —2017: Saath Nibhaana Saathiya as Urvashi Singh
2018: Bepannaah

Films 
 Kanoon Apna Apna (1989) as Basanti
 Indrajeet (1991) in Reshmi Zulfein
 Gardish (1993)cas a Bar dancer (cameo)
 Ganga Jamuna Ki Lalkar (1991)
 Ajooba (1991)
 I Love India (1993) (Tamil) dancer in song "Kurukku Paadhayile"
 Uzhaippali (1993) Tamil movie for the item song "Mynaa Mynaa" special appearance.
 Pathreela Raasta (1994)
 Hero No. 1 (1997) as Anil Dhawan's wife
 Mehndi (1998)
 Sirf Tum (1999) as Aarti's Sister
 International Khiladi (1999) as Rahul's Mother
Gang (2000)
 Isi Life Mein (2010) as Maa'sa
 My Father Godfather (2014) as Mamiji
 Laila Majnu (2018) as Laila's aunt
 Tara Vs Bilal as Zoya, Bilal Khan's Khaala (Aunt)

References

External links 
 
 

Indian film actresses
Actresses from Mumbai
Indian soap opera actresses
Actresses in Hindi cinema
Indian television actresses
Living people
Year of birth missing (living people)